Wagonhound Creek is a stream in the U.S. state of South Dakota.

Wagonhound Creek was named for the fact old wagon parts (specifically, "wagon hounds") were left along its course.

See also
List of rivers of South Dakota

References

Rivers of Stanley County, South Dakota
Rivers of South Dakota